Dean Lake is a lake in Crow Wing County, in the U.S. state of Minnesota.

Dean Lake was named for Joseph Dean, a lumberman who worked in the area.

See also
List of lakes in Minnesota

References

Lakes of Minnesota
Lakes of Crow Wing County, Minnesota